In 2020, the U.S. government announced that it was considering banning the Chinese social media platform TikTok upon a request from then-U.S. president Donald Trump, who viewed the app as a national security threat. The result was that TikTok owner ByteDance—which initially planned on selling a small portion of TikTok to an American company—agreed to divest TikTok to prevent a ban in the United States and in other countries where restrictions are also being considered due to privacy concerns, which themselves are mostly related to its ownership by a firm based in China.

TikTok would later announce plans to file legal action challenging the order's transactional prohibitions with U.S. companies. The lawsuit against the Trump administration's order was filed on August 24, and contended that the administration's order was motivated by Trump's efforts to boost re-election support through protectionist trade policies aimed at China. A separate suit filed the same day by TikTok's U.S. technical program manager Patrick Ryan against Trump and Secretary of Commerce Wilbur Ross sought a temporary restraining order (TRO), arguing that his due process rights were violated and the ban was an "unconstitutional taking" of Ryan's property under the Fifth Amendment; the suit also claimed Trump's action was likely a retaliation because of the TikTok pranks targeting the June 20 campaign rally.

American technology company Microsoft had previously proposed an idea to acquire TikTok's algorithm and other artificial intelligence technology, but this was declined by ByteDance, as its executives expressed concern that it would likely be opposed by the Chinese government, which criticized the Trump administration's order previously as a "smash and grab" forced sale and (on September 13, 2021) suggested it would prefer the shuttering of U.S. operations over such a sale.

Background 

In January 2019, an investigation by the American think tank Peterson Institute for International Economics described TikTok as a "Huawei-sized problem" that posed a national security threat to the West, because of the app's popularity with Western users. They included armed forces personnel and its alleged ability to convey location, image and biometric data to its Chinese parent company, which is legally unable to refuse to share data with the Chinese government under the China Internet Security Law. Observers have also said that ByteDance's founder and CEO Zhang Yiming issued a letter in 2018 stating that his company would "further deepen cooperation" with the ruling Chinese Communist Party to promote its policies. TikTok's parent company ByteDance says that TikTok is not available in China and its data is stored outside of China, but its privacy policy has reserved the right to share any information with Chinese authorities. In response to national security, censorship, and anti-boycott compliance concerns, in October 2019, Senator Marco Rubio asked the Committee on Foreign Investment in the United States (CFIUS) to open an investigation into TikTok and its parent company ByteDance. The same month, Senators Tom Cotton and Chuck Schumer sent a joint letter to the Director of National Intelligence requesting a security review of TikTok and its parent company. In July 2020, the United States Department of the Treasury admitted that TikTok was under CFIUS review.

In November 2019, it was reported that the Committee on Foreign Investment in the United States opened an investigation into ByteDance's acquisition of Musical.ly. The same month, following a request by Senator Chuck Schumer, U.S. Army Secretary Ryan McCarthy agreed to assess the risks of using TikTok as a recruitment tool. Senator Josh Hawley introduced the National Security and Personal Data Protection Act to prohibit TikTok's parent company and others from transferring personal data of Americans to China. Senator Josh Hawley also introduced a bill to ban downloading and using TikTok on government devices because of national security concerns. In December 2019, the United States Navy as well as the U.S. Army banned TikTok from all government-issued devices. The Transportation Security Administration also prohibited its personnel from posting on the platform for outreach purposes. Following its prohibition by the U.S. military, the Australian Defence Force also banned TikTok on its devices. Legislation was subsequently introduced in the U.S. Senate that would prohibit all federal employees from using or downloading TikTok.

The Democratic National Committee issued a warning to the Democratic campaigns, state parties, and committees to ensure that additional security measures are implemented while using TikTok, citing concerns regarding the application's spying nature. In July 2020, the Joe Biden 2020 presidential campaign instructed its staff to delete TikTok for security reasons.

Experts have been split on the question of whether or not TikTok poses a security risk, with some saying that it does while other experts have said that it does not.

Trump administration

Executive order to ban TikTok 
On July 7, 2020, U.S. Secretary of State Mike Pompeo announced that the government was considering banning TikTok. In response, Sarah Cook, Freedom House's research director for China, Hong Kong, and Taiwan, suggested that Trump's proposed TikTok ban may threaten free speech and "set a very problematic precedent" for banning apps in the United States. Patrick Jackson, chief technology officer of privacy company Disconnect, said the app sends an abnormal amount of data—mostly information about the phone—to its server, but there is limited evidence that TikTok is sharing these data with the Chinese government. He also noted that the amount of collected data was similar to that collected by American-originated social media platforms and was less than that collected by Facebook.

On July 31, 2020, President Donald Trump announced a decision ordering China's ByteDance to divest ownership of the application, and had threatened to shut down its U.S. operations through executive action as soon as August 1 if the company did not comply. While the President has authority to intervene in transactions involving foreign companies doing business in the United States (including placing companies on an "entity list" that restricts a company's ability to conduct business with American companies), although their sanctioning authority in relation to imported communications or information materials protected by the First Amendment is restricted under the International Emergency Economic Powers Act (“IEEPA”) and the Trading with the Enemy Act of 1917 ("TWEA"), Trump did not specify how he would enforce a ban. Microsoft was reported to be in talks of acquiring the company. Later that day, President Trump announced plans to ban TikTok in the United States, and signaled opposition to any sale to a U.S.-based company. Trump's ban threat and his indication he would oppose any sale to an American buyer was condemned by TikTok users, many of whom argued that national security concerns were being used as a cover by the administration to justify a ban as retaliation for pranks aimed at Trump by TikTok users (particularly, a ticket-purchasing effort to inflate projected and depress actual attendance of his June 20 campaign rally in Tulsa, Oklahoma) and other content satirizing Trump or critical of him and his actions, especially in relation to his response to the George Floyd protests. Some have speculated that a ban or the threat thereof would result in political backlash, pushing many users (particularly within the app's core user base of adults aged 18–34, including those eligible to vote for the first time, which make up roughly 50% of the app's U.S. users) to vote against Trump, likely in favor of Democratic nominee Joe Biden, in the 2020 presidential election.

After Trump proposed to ban TikTok in the U.S on July 31, 2020, security researchers expressed their concern about limitations of freedom. In one article, PCMag quoted Jennifer Granick of the American Civil Liberties Union Surveillance and Cybersecurity Counsel who said that "banning an app that millions of Americans use to communicate with each other is a danger to free expression and is technologically impractical."

On August 1, ByteDance—which initially sought to maintain a minority interest in a sale to a U.S. buyer—agreed to divest TikTok outright to prevent a ban in the United States and in other countries (including Japan, Pakistan and Australia) where restrictions are also being considered because of privacy concerns primarily related to its ownership by a China-based firm. A preliminary deal to sell the platform to Microsoft was submitted to President Trump for review, in which Microsoft would also assume data management responsibilities; preliminary terms allowed American investors in the platform to eventually acquire minority stakes in TikTok post-sale. South Carolina Sen. Lindsey Graham later expressed support for the Microsoft proposal. In a video statement posted on TikTok that morning, Manager of U.S. Operations Vanessa Pappas stated that the company is "not planning on going anywhere" and is "building the safest app because we know it's the right thing to do." On August 2, it was reported by The Wall Street Journal that Microsoft paused talks with ByteDance. Later that day, Microsoft confirmed that talks would continue following a conversation between CEO Satya Nadella and President Trump. Reportedly, after White House advisers persuaded him to hold off on banning TikTok outright because of the possible legal and political repercussions involved, Trump subsequently agreed to put a 45-day hold on any action against TikTok to allow ByteDance to divest the platform to Microsoft or, should a deal with the tech company not materialize, another American corporation. On August 6, Trump signed an executive order banning the platform in 45 days if it is not sold by ByteDance; Trump also signed a similar order against the WeChat application owned by the Chinese multinational company Tencent. On August 14, Trump issued a new executive order giving ByteDance 90 days to sell or spin off its U.S. TikTok business. In the order, Trump said that there is "credible evidence" that leads him to believe that ByteDance "might take action that threatens to impair the national security of the United States." On August 17, Oracle entered the race to buy TikTok's operations in the United States, Canada, Australia, and New Zealand, working with U.S. investors—including General Atlantic and Sequoia Capital, who own stakes in TikTok—to secure a bid.

Legal cases in response to attempted ban 

On August 21, TikTok announced plans to file legal action challenging the order's to-be-outlined transactional prohibitions with U.S. companies. The lawsuit against the Trump administration's order—formally filed in the U.S. District Court for the Central District of California on August 24—contended that the administration's order was motivated by Trump's efforts to boost re-election support through protectionist trade policies aimed at China; that TikTok/ByteDance was deprived of due process rights under the Fifth Amendment that apply to foreign and domestic businesses; failed to provide evidence that TikTok was a bona fide security threat or provide "justification for its punitive actions"; had relied on a May 2019 national emergency declaration with respect to "Securing the Information and Communications Technology and Services Supply Chain", rather than invoking a new emergency declaration; and that the purported national security threat identified by the CFIUS was based on "outdated news articles" and did not address demonstrative data security documentation provided by TikTok. The company iterated that many of its top personnel—including then-CEO Kevin Mayer—were based within the United States and were not subject to Chinese law, and that content moderation was led by an independent, U.S.-based technical staff. The lawsuit also contended that the order's application of the IEEPA violated a 1994 Congressional amendment expanding the act's list of First Amendment-protected materials to encompass any media, including software technologies, regardless of "format or medium of transmission."

A separate suit filed in the U.S. District Court for the Northern District of California the same day by TikTok U.S. technical program manager Patrick Ryan against Trump and Secretary of Commerce Wilbur Ross sought a temporary restraining order (TRO) preventing its enforcement by the U.S. Department of Commerce in order to ensure that TikTok employees could continue to be paid their salaries, arguing that the executive order's restrictions on financial transactions with banks, credit firms and payroll providers unlawfully jeopardizes TikTok U.S. employees' ability to receive salary payments, and that the ambiguity on prohibited transactions with ByteDance violated Ryan's due process rights as well as being an "unconstitutional taking" of Ryan's property under the Fifth Amendment. In addition to claims that it was motivated by anti-China bias, the lawsuit also said Trump's action was likely also a retaliatory action over the aforementioned prank targeting the June 20 campaign rally. The Department of Justice contended in a September 10 response to Ryan's lawsuit that his claims of irreparable financial harm by the order is speculative until Ross issued further guidance on 20 September and alone did not justify a TRO, and that neither Ryan nor the court had the right to determine whether the order was issued in response to a bona fide national emergency because it is a "nonjusticiable political question" and Congress has not created a right of action for citizens to challenge use of the IEEPA and the National Emergencies Act.

On August 28, the Chinese government's Commerce and Science and Technology Ministries updated their export control rules, restricting the export of "technology based on data analysis for personalized information recommendation services." The restrictions—which had not been updated since 2008 and, although government officials asserted that it was not aimed at any particular company, was seen as an effort to delay or prohibit a full sale of TikTok—effectively required ByteDance to undergo a government-reviewed licensing procedure if parts of TikTok were sold to a company based outside China.

Proposed sale to Oracle 
On September 13, ByteDance informed Microsoft that it would not sell TikTok's U.S. operations to the Seattle-based tech company; at issue was Microsoft's proposal to acquire TikTok's algorithm and other artificial intelligence technology, which ByteDance executives expressed concern would likely be opposed by the Chinese government, which criticized the Trump administration's order previously as a "smash and grab" forced sale and on September 13, suggested it would prefer the shuttering of U.S. operations over such a sale. Later on September 13, it was reported that TikTok had chosen Oracle to act as the former's "trusted tech partner"; the partnership—intended to address the Trump administration's concerns over data security, and avoid an outright sale of its business and technological assets that the Chinese government would likely oppose—would involve ByteDance transferring management of the app's U.S. user data to Oracle's cloud services, and possibly offering it and other investors expanded minority stakes in the U.S. operations whilst allowing ByteDance to keep control of TikTok's business assets and technological IP. Observers stated that political considerations also played a factor in the deal, citing Oracle Co-Founder, Executive Chairman and Chief Technology Officer Larry Ellison's support of Trump—one of the few U.S. tech executives to support his presidency—and his role as one of Trump's major campaign donors as well as Co-CEO Safra Catz's former role on Trump's transition team following his 2016 election.

On September 15, the Financial Times reported that this would be structured as a spin-off of TikTok as an independent company with minority stakes held by Oracle — who will be responsible for ensuring that user data is processed under U.S. jurisdiction.

The Associated Press reported on September 18 that the U.S. would proceed with its ban on TikTok downloads on 20 September 2020, followed by a complete ban of using the app on November 12.

On September 19, TikTok and its parent company, ByteDance Ltd., filed a complaint in Washington, challenging the Trump administration's recent moves to prevent the app from operating in the U.S., citing that the administration did so for political reasons rather than to stop an "unusual and extraordinary threat". The Trump administration postponed the planned ban on September 20 by a week.

Preliminary injunction 
On 23 September 2020, TikTok filed a request for a preliminary injunction to prevent the app from being banned by the Trump administration. This request was filed with the District Court for the District of Columbia. Just a week prior, a different preliminary injunction from WeChat users filed with the United States District Court for the Northern District of California was approved by Magistrate Judge Laurel Beeler.

The preliminary injunction was approved by Judge Carl J. Nichols on September 27.

Biden administration 
Donald Trump left office January 20, 2021.  The following June, new president Joe Biden signed an executive order revoking the Trump administration ban on TikTok, and instead ordered the Secretary of Commerce to investigate the app to determine if it poses a threat to U.S. national security. On June 25, 2021, CNBC reported that "Direction and approvals for all kinds of decision-making, whether it be minor contracts or key strategies, come from ByteDance’s leadership, which is based in China." According to Jim Lewis, a strategic technologies researcher at CSIS, "If the Chinese government wants to look at the data that ByteDance is collecting, they can do so, and no one can say anything about it."

In October 2021, following the Facebook Files and controversies about social media ethics, a bipartisan group of lawmakers also pressed TikTok, YouTube, and Snapchat on questions of data privacy and moderation for age appropriate content. Lawmakers questioned head of U.S. policy at TikTok Mr. Beckerman about whether TikTok’s Chinese ownership could expose consumer data to Beijing stating concern that the company could be required by the Chinese government to turn Americans’ data over to the government. TikTok told U.S. lawmakers it does not give information to China's government. TikTok's representative stated that TikTok's data is stored in the U.S. with backups in Singapore. According to the company's representative, TikTok had 'no affiliation' with the subsidiary Beijing ByteDance Technology, in which the Chinese government has a minority stake and board seat.

Aftermath 
In June 2022 reports emerged that ByteDance employees in China could access US data and repeatedly accessed the private information of TikTok users, TikTok employees were cited saying that "everything is seen in China," while one director claimed a Beijing-based engineer referred to as a "Master Admin" has "access to everything."

Following the reports, TikTok announced that 100% of its US user traffic is now being routed to Oracle Cloud, along with their intention to delete all US user data from their own datacenters. This deal stems from the talks with Oracle instigated in September 2020 in the midst of Trump's threat to ban TikTok in the US.

On June 24 and June 28, FCC Commissioner Brendan Carr called for Google and Apple to remove TikTok from their app stores, citing national security concerns, saying TikTok "harvests swaths of sensitive data that new reports show are being accessed in Beijing." In November, U.S. Senators 
Mark Warner and Tom Cotton called for greater action against TikTok, while Senator Marco Rubio and Representative Mike Gallagher announced their intentions to introduce legislation to ban the platform.

On December 2, FBI director Chris Wray warned about the security threats posed by TikTok. In response, South Dakota and several other states, often Republican-controlled ones, banned the use of TikTok on government computers and smartphones. Later that month, Congress passed a bill to do the same on federal devices as part of the spending bill for fiscal year 2023.

By late 2022 both Republicans and Democrats were coming to the conclusion that Trump was right with Senator Warner VA stated “As painful as it is for me to say, if Donald Trump was right and we could’ve taken action then, that’d have been a heck of a lot easier than trying to take action in November of 2022,” Warner told Recode. “The sooner we bite the bullet, the better.”

References

TikTok
Trump administration controversies